Yoshiko is a feminine Japanese given name.

Possible writings
The name Yoshiko can have a variety of different meanings depending on which kanji characters are used to write it. Over 200 possible variations of the name exist. Some of the most common variations of Yoshiko include:
 良子; good, child
 佳子; agreeable, child
 美子; beautiful, child
 義子; moral and just, child
 吉子; fortunate, child
 悦子; joyful, child
 祥子; auspicious, child
 芳子; fragrant, child
 慶子; jubilant, child
 好子; fond and pleasing, child

Japanese royalty
 Yoshiko, daughter of Emperor Saga (786–842)
 Fujiwara no Yoshiko (died 807), consort of Emperor Kanmu
 Yoshiko (1122–1133), daughter of Emperor Toba
 Yoshiko, daughter of Emperor Reigen (1654–1732)
 Princess Yoshiko (Kōkaku) (1779–1846), empress consort of Emperor Kōkaku
 Princess Yoshiko (Arisugawa-no-miya) (1804–1893), mother of the last shogun Tokugawa Yoshinobu
 Yoshiko Kawashima (1907–1948), princess of Manchuria

Others
 Princess Kishi (929–985), also known as Yoshiko Joō, Japanese poet
, Japanese archer
, Japanese long-distance runner
, Japanese long-distance runner
, Japanese sport wrestler
, Japanese sport shooter
Yoshiko Iwamoto Wada (born 1944) American textile artist, author
, Japanese actress
, Japanese lawyer
, Japanese actress
, Japanese swimmer
, Japanese manga artist
, Japanese voice actress
, Japanese journalist
, Japanese novelist
, Japanese writer
, Japanese accounting scholar
, Japanese swimmer
, Japanese speed skater
, Japanese professional wrestler
, Japanese actress
, Japanese table tennis player
, Japanese manga artist, illustrator and animator
, Japanese singer, actress and politician
, Japanese badminton player

Fictional characters
 Yoshiko Fujisawa, a fictional character from Captain Tsubasa
 Yoshiko Hanabatake, a fictional character from the Japanese manga series Aho Girl
 Yoshiko Koizumi, a fictional character from manga Little Ghost Q-Taro
 Yoshiko Kunieda, a fictional character from The Brave Fighter of Sun Fighbird
 Yoshiko Nishizawa, a fictional character from the anime/manga series Strike Witches
 Yoshiko Nonomiya, a fictional character from Natsume Soseki’s novel Sanshirō
 Yoshiko Tsushima, a fictional character from the Japanese multimedia project Love Live! Sunshine!!

See also
 "Yoshiko (song)", a 1964 American pop song performed by The J's with Jamie
 Yoshiko (wrestler) (born 1993), Japanese professional wrestler

Japanese feminine given names